Megan Duffy (born August 22, 1979) is an American actress and producer based in Los Angeles, California.

Biography
Megan Duffy was born in Springfield, Massachusetts and was raised in Enfield, Connecticut. She spent her youth and teen years studying dance, winning a scholarship to Broadway Dance Center at age 14. When an injury kept her from further pursuing dance, she relocated to Los Angeles, where she now works as a print model, actress, producer and director.

As an actress, Duffy has appeared in several national commercials and television series, including Torchwood: Miracle Day, Mad Men, Criminal Minds, Gilmore Girls, and The Affair. Megan has also appeared in music videos for Regina Spektor, Travis, Robert Randolph and the Family Band and My Chemical Romance, as well as over 50 national commercials.  She plays Lucie in the feature film Maniac and is a lead cast member of the horror comedy role playing podcast Fear Initiative.

Filmography

Film

Television

Videography

As producer
 "Turn It Up" for Taryn Manning
 "Fight For You" for Morgan Page
 "Lonely Child" for Boomkat
 "It's Only Natural" for The Higher
 "G.L.O.W." for Smashing Pumpkins
 "Run Boy" for Boomkat
 "Healer" for Torche
 "Across the Shields" for Torche
 "Dead Between the Walls" for Pelican (band)
 "By All Means" for National Product
 "Runaway" for Boomkat

As director
 "Hello" for Gabrielle Wortman
 "Low" for Smoke Season
 "9 to 5" for Allie Goertz
 "Monsters Trick or Treat" for Sean Keller

References

 Variety
 Daily Dead
 Dread Central
 TV Guide

External links 
 
 Official site
 Videostatic 2009
 TVguide.com
 Videostatic 2008
Collider Interview
W Magazine Premieres "Hello" video

1979 births
American television actresses
Actors from Springfield, Massachusetts
Actresses from Los Angeles
People from Enfield, Connecticut
Living people
21st-century American actresses
Actresses from Massachusetts
Actresses from Connecticut